Prunus clarofolia (shiny-leaf cherry) is a species of cherry found in Anhui, Gansu, Guizhou, Hebei, Henan, Hubei, Hunan, Ningxia, Shaanxi, Shanxi, Sichuan, Tibet, Yunnan and Zhejiang provinces of China. A shrubby tree 2.5 to 20m tall, it prefers to grow on mountain slopes between 800 and 3,600m above sea level. As Prunus litigiosa it is called the tassel cherry and sold as an ornamental for its interesting flowers and columnar form.

References

clarofolia
Cherries
Endemic flora of China
Flora of North-Central China
Flora of South-Central China
Flora of Southeast China
Flora of Tibet
Cherry blossom
Trees of China
Ornamental trees
Plants described in 1905